Muse Games is an American indie video game developer based in New York City. They are best known for their game Guns of Icarus Online, and subsequent companion game Guns of Icarus Alliance. Their newest game, Embr, is in early access on Steam.

Games developed

External links 
 Official website

References 

Video game development companies
Indie video game developers
Video game companies established in 2008
Video game companies of the United States
Privately held companies based in New York City
2008 establishments in New York City